Vennila Kabaddi Kuzhu 2 is a 2019 Indian Tamil-language sports action film directed by Selva Sekaran. A sequel to Vennila Kabadi Kuzhu (2009), the film is written by the original's director Suseenthiran and features Vikranth and Arthana Binu. An ensemble cast including Pasupathy, Kishore, Anupama Kumar, Soori, Appukutty, and Ganja Karuppu also plays pivotal roles. Featuring music composed by V. Selvaganesh, the venture began production in December 2016 and was released on 12 July 2019.

Plot
Saravanan makes a living by selling audio cassettes. His father Saamy is a bus driver by profession, but his heart lies in Kabadi, and wherever a match is being played, he makes his presence there, thereby neglecting his work and getting suspended. Saravanan scolds his father often for his mistakes, and the family decides to sell all the jewels that they have and buy an ambassador car for Saamy to drive, but he loses that too for a good deed, angering everyone. Elsewhere, Saravanan falls for a college girl named Malar from an upper-class family, and problems start for him. At an important juncture, Saravanan discovers who his father really is and sets out to become a Kabadi player, a sport which he hates, for his father. Whether the hero succeeds in his mission or not and gets his girl forms the rest of the story.

Cast

 Vikranth as Saravanan
 Arthana Binu as Malar
 Pasupathy as Saamy, Saravanan's father
 Anupama Kumar as Chinnathaayi, Saravanan's mother
 Soori as Subramani
 Kishore as Savadamuthu
 Ganja Karuppu as Pandi, Saravanan's uncle
 Ravi Mariya as Pazhani, Malar's father
 Sonia Venkat as Malar's mother
 Appukutty as Appukutty
 Aruldoss as Doss
 Vasu Vikram
 Akalya
 Madurai Saroja as Malar's grandmother
 Poraali Dileepan as Kumar
 Karur Murali as Murali, Saravanan's friend
 Benjamin as Saravanan's friend
 Mippu as Saravanan's friend
 Pechimuthu
 Nitish Veera as Sekar
 Hari Vairavan as Ayyappan
 Ramesh Pandiyan as Pandi
 Maayi Sundar as Murthy
 Rail Ravi as Police Inspector
 Thavasi as Kodangi
 Paun Raj as Murugan
 Ashwanth Ashokkumar as Young Saravanan
 Jatti Jaganathan as Young Saravanan's friend
 Vijay Ganesh
 Raandilya as Kabbadi Player
 Priya Asmitha in a special appearance

Soundtrack
The film's soundtrack was composed by V. Selvaganesh.

Production
Suseenthiran had written a script for the sequel of Vennila Kabadi Kuzhu (2009) soon after the release of the film, with the story taking forward the tale of the kabadi team following the death of their captain, portrayed by Vishnu in the original film. In March 2015, it was announced that Lakshman Narayan had been signed on to play the lead role after Suseenthiran was impressed with his performance in Jeeva (2014), while Pasupathy would portray his father. Aishwarya Dutta was also brought in to feature as the lead actress, before the film was put on hold.

News about the project re-emerged in November 2016, where it was revealed that Vikranth had instead been signed on to play the lead role. The film began production in a temple in Kovilanchery in the outskirts of Chennai on 10 December 2016, with actors from the original film like Kishore, Soori and Appukutty revealed to be playing pivotal roles. Pasupathy and Anupama Kumar joined the cast to essay important roles. A debutant actress, Arthana, was also brought in to play the leading female role.

References

External links
 

2010s Tamil-language films
Indian action films
Indian sports films
Indian sequel films
Films scored by V. Selvaganesh
2019 films
2019 action films
Kabaddi in India
Sports action films